Jean Hatzfeld (29 November 1880 – 30 May 1947, aged 66) was a French archaeologist and Hellenist. He was a member of the French School at Athens, a professor at the Sorbonne (1928–1930) and at the École pratique des hautes études (1937).

Selected works
1926: Histoire de la Grèce ancienne, Paris, 1926
3e éd., revue et corrigée par André Aymard, Paris, Payot, 1950
rééd. coll. « Petite Bibliothèque Payot », 1962, 1995, 2002
1945: La Grèce et son héritage, Paris, Éditions Montaigne, (Aubier)
1951: Alcibiade. Étude sur l'histoire d'Athènes à la fin du Ve siècle, Paris, Presses universitaires de France.

External links 

French archaeologists
French hellenists
1880 births
1947 deaths
Academic staff of the University of Paris
Academic staff of the École pratique des hautes études
Members of the French School at Athens
20th-century archaeologists